John Louis Donnelly (November 15, 1850 – December 24, 1913) was an American infielder in professional baseball. He played in the National Association for the 1873 Washington Blue Legs and 1874 Philadelphia Whites.

External links

1850 births
1913 deaths
19th-century baseball players
Major League Baseball infielders
Washington Blue Legs players
Philadelphia White Stockings players
Baseball players from Philadelphia